Raja Jitamitra Malla (Nepal bhasa:) was a Malla Dynasty King of Bhaktapur, Nepal from 1673 to 1696.

He left his throne in 1696 to his eldest son Bhupatindra Malla to spend the rest of his life in religious activities. He died 14 years after leaving the throne to his son.

Construction efforts
Son of Sri Jaya Jagatprakasa Malla Raja, he was noted for his construction projects. In 1674 he built a Shikara-style Shiva temple with a gilded repousse mask of the God on each side in Bhaktapur. In 1682 he built near the Durbar the two-storied Dharmasala Palace in which there is a golden Mahadeva. The palace was used by royalty until 1769 and today is a museum and part of the World Heritage Site on Durbar Square. To the east of this he erected the temple and statue of Narayana, along with the temples of Dattatrikasa and Pashupati. An inscription in 1678 states that he built the royal palace Thanathu Dubar and its gardens and courtyard. Jitamitra was also credited with restoring Kumari Chowk, the images of Astamatrikas and in 1690, donated two large cooper kettledrums (nagara) or bells to his favourite deity, the goddess Taleju for the gilded roof of Taleju. He also contributed a finely carved wooden tympanum above the main entrance to the Mul Chowk and also erected many memorials in Bhaktapur.

His son, Bhupatindra Malla who succeed him in 1696 was equally fascinated with architecture, and continued the development of the Dharmsala Palace, its 55 windows and gardens.

References

Malla rulers of Bhaktapur
1663 births
1696 deaths
People from Bhaktapur
17th-century Nepalese people
Nepalese Hindus